Kobzars and bandurists were a unique class of musicians in Ukraine, who travelled between towns and sang dumas, a meditative poem-song. Kobzars were usually blind, and required the completion of a three-year apprenticeship in specialized Kobzar guilds, in order to be officially recognized as such. In 1932, on the order of Stalin, the Soviet authorities called on all Ukrainian Kobzars to attend a congress in Kharkiv. Those that arrived were taken outside the city and were all put to death.

Persecution of bandurists and kobzari by the Soviet authorities can be divided up into various periods. These periods differed in the type and length of persecution and punishments were dealt out and also the reason for the punishment. Following is a list of persecuted Bandurists sourced from Music from the shadows Roman Malko and The Voices of the Dead by Kuromiya Hiroaki.

A

 Andriychyk, Hryhoriy – member of Kiev Bandurist Capella arrested in 1937, shot in 1938.
 Andrusenko, Mykhailo – director of the Kryvorih Bandurist Capella – arrested in 1937.

B

 Babych, Andriyan – sentenced to be shot in 1937.
 Balatsky, Dmytro – director of Kiev Bandurist Capella – arrested October 1938. Five years' exile to Kazakhstan – rehabilitated 13/7/1956.
 Bartashevsky, Yuri – director of Kiev Children's Bandurist Capella.
 Bashtovyj, Davyd – sentenced to be shot in 1938.
 Bayda-Sukhovyj Danylo – arrested in 1937.
 Hryhoriy Bazhul – student of Hnat Khotkevych; spent 2 years in a forced labour camp and 2 years in exile.
 Betz-Kharchenko, S.
 Bezchasnyj, Konon – (1884–1967) – Kuban bandurist; repressed and arrested in 1937.
 Bezpalyj, Ihnat – sentenced to be shot in 1937.
 Mykola Bohuslavsky – funded Bandurist groups in the Kuban'. Arrested, believed to have been shot.
 Ivan Boretz – member of the Kiev, Kharkiv and later Poltava Bandurist Capellas. Director of the Horiv Bandura Ensemble – arrested on September 21, 1937, and shot on November 11, 1937. Rehabilitated on December 9, 1957.
 Oleksandr Borodai – an American citizen who returned to Ukraine. Arrested in 1919 and shot.
 But, Ivan

C

 Chernihivetz, Tymofiy – Arrested 30/10/1937 – 10 years' hard labour. Rehabilitated 27/11/56.
 Chumak, Nykyfor – arrested in 1931 – 3 years' exile. Arrested again on March 30, 1937, and sentenced to death. Shot on March 23, 1938, at 23.00.
 Chumak, I – Director of the Myrhorod Bandura Ensemble.

D

 Danylevsky, Borys Ivanovych – arrested on April 22, 1938, shot on July 29, 1938.
 Deineka, Karpo – (b. 1897) from Konotop.
 Derhiy, O.
 Diadurenko, Trohkym – sentenced to be shot in 1938.
 Dibrova, Fedir – member of Kuban Bandura Group – shot in 1919.
 Demchenko, Mykola – (b. 1873) originally from Kharkiv Oblast
 Domontovych, Mykhailo – shot ca. 1928.
 Doroshko, Fedir Vasylievych – arrested in 1918 for counter-revolutionary agitation, arrested in 1937, shot in 1938.
 Drevchenko, Petro – (b. 1871) kobzar, died in 1934.
 Dumenko, Luka – kobzar.
 Oleksiy Dziubenko – arrested on October 19, 1937.

F

 Fed'ko, A
 Fedorenko, Vasyl – kobzar.

H

 Halynsky-Lopata, Ivan – arrested in 1938, sentenced to be shot and commuted to 12 years in labour camps in Karelia.
 Oleksander Hamaliya – shot in Kiev in 1920 .
 Pavlo Hashchenko – kobzar.
 Hasiuk, Oleh – given 25 years of incarceration in the city of Inti Komi ARSR from 1949. Rehabilitated in 1956. Originally from the city of Lviv.
 Herashchenko, Oles' – Student of Hnat Khotkevych. Arrested 1932.
 Vasyl' Herasymenko – 2 years' incarceration.
 Hlushak, Nykyfor Ivanovych – (b. 1890) Arrested in 1931. Arrested again in 1937 and sentenced to 10 years of hard labour.
 Fedir Hlushko – director of the Kharkiv Bandurist Capella – Arrested 1937.
 Hlushko, Konstiantyn – sentenced to be shot in 1938.
 Hnylokvas, Semen – arrested in 1938. Arrested again during the German occupation. Arrested again by the Soviets in 1948 and spent time in the very same cell as before. Spent 10 years in camps in Mordovia, later released. Performed in Kiev in 1981.
 Honcharenko, V.
 Hubenko, Mykhailo – (b. 1891) from Myrhorod.
 Hura, (Hurin) Petro Ivanovych – originally from Poltava lived in Yuzivka. Disappeared.
 Huzij, Petro Ivanovych (1903–37) Kuban bandurist and a bandura maker. Arrested on December 1, 1937. Sentenced to death and shot on December 23, 1937.

K

 Kabachok, Volodymyr – arrested 1934 – 3 months' incarceration, arrested August 1937. Sentenced to 10 years' hard labour.
 Kashuba, Josyp – member of the Kiev Bandurist Capella and later the Kharkiv Bandurist Capella.
 Khotkevych, Hnat – Tortured, then executed on 8 October 1938. Posthumously rehabilitated in 1956.
 Khrystenko, Makar – (b 1870) from Dnipropetrovsk.
 Khudoriavyj, P.
 Knysh, H.
 Kolesnyk, Panteleimon – sentence to be shot.
 Kolodub
 Kononenko, Andriy – arrested in 1938. Member of Poltava Bandurist Capella.
 Kononenko, Pylyp Petrovych- Member of Poltava Kapela, Kharkiv Capella, and Konotop Capella. (Possibly mixed up with Andriy?)
 Konoplich, Kindrat – (b. 1900) member of Kiev Bandurist Capella
 Kopan, Heorhiy – Arrested in 1930. Protested the censorship of Ukrainian songs. Arrested in 1936. Arrested again on March 19, 1938, and shot on March 28, 1938.
 Koretskiy, A.
 Kornievsky, Oleksander – 10 years' incarceration, 15 years' exile.
 Korobka, P.
 Kotelevetz, Josyp
 Krasniak, Marko – sentenced to be shot in 1938.
 Kravchenko, Danylo S.- arrested 1938 sent to Kolyma, later released. Member of the Veresai Bandura Quintet.
 Krutko, Mykola – arrested on February 1, 1938, and sentenced to be shot in the same year. Rehabilitated on March 12, 1959.
 Kryuzhkovenko, – sent to Siberia in 1917.
 Kucherenko, Ivan – Blind kobzar; People's artist; Arrested on November 8, 1937, and shot on November 24, 1937.
 Kuzhkovenko
 Kuzmenko, I.

L

 Lavryk, Teresa – from Lviv. Student of Singalevych. Sent to Siberia 1944
 Lavrysh, Petro – (b. 1873) Poltava region
 Liashenko, Ivan
 Lysyj, Stepan – 10 years.
 Lysyj, Vasyl' – 10 years.
 Lystopad, Volodymyr
 Lytvynenko – Odessa

M

 Matiukha, Maksym – Konotop.
 Mohyl'nyk, Vasyl' – sentenced to be shot in 1938.
 Mota – shot in Lviv by Soviets in 1939
 Mykhailov, Mykola – 1936. Died unexpectedly in Tashkent from angina
 Mykolenko, Z.
 Mynzarenko, Demian – arrested 1936.
 Myronenko, Mykyta – sentenced to be shot in 1938.
 Antin Mytiay (Petukh) – Shot by the Bolsheviks near Kiev, 1921.

N

 Nimchenko, Kuzma – bandura maker from the Kuban.

O

 Oleksienko, Petro – Participant of the Winter campaign in 1918. Killed in 1919.
 Oleshko, V. – student of Hnat Khotkevych
 Opryshko, Mykola – arrested in 1931, and in 1937 after directing the Kiev Capella for 2 weeks.
 Osad'ko, Vasyl' – director of the Reshetylivsky Bandurist Ensemble.
 Ovchinnikov, Vasyl' – Arrested in 1916 and exiled to Siberia. Arrested again in 1934 Never heard of again.

P

 Parasochka, Vasyl'
 Panasenko, Josyp – member of the Poltava Bandurist Capella and Ukrainian Bandurist Chorus.
 Panchenko, Fedir
 Paplynsky, Antin – bandura maker.
 Pasiuha, Stepan – kobzar.
 Petukh – see Mytiay – Shot – Kiev 1920.
 Pika, Danylo – Arrested numerous times.
 Pobihailo, Oleksij
 Popov, Mykola – sentenced to be shot in 1938.
 Potapenko, Vasyl' – arrested on October 15, 1930 – other arrests.
 Povar, Panas
 Protopopov, Yakiv – member of Poltava Bandurist Capella.
 Prudkyj, Nykin – 5/6 years
 Prystupa, Mykhailo – sentenced to be shot in 1938.

R

 Rastorhuyev, Serhiy – sentenced to be shot in 1938.
 Rozhchenko (Rozhko) Pylyp – from Konotop.
 Rudenko, Danylo – Kobzar from Chernihiv.

S

 Sadovy, Serhiy – sentenced to be shot in 1938.
 Sadovskyj, Hennadiy – Baritone; took part in the armies of the UNR. Arrested and sent to the Solovetsky islands. Dug the Belomor canal.
 Salata, D.
 Sarma-Sokolovsky, Mykola – 17 years.
 Shcherbyna, Danylo – arrested on April 19, 1931. Further arrests.
 Shevchuk, H.
 Shuliak, Mykola – 15 years.
 Singalevych, Natalia – Arrested in 1950.
 Siroshtan, Ivan – kobzar.
 Skakun, Andriy – Member of Kiev Capella.
 Skoba, Antin – Kobzar.
 Skrypal, N.
 Skyba, Ivan – arrested 1938.
 Skydan, Petro – Murdered in 1920.
 Slidiuk, Andriy – Member of Kiev Kobzar Choir – Shot by the Bolsheviks in 1919 in Starokonstantynivka.
 Snizhnyj, Josyp – sentence to camps.
 Sohohub, Viktor – arrested 1931, Arrested 30 July 1937 – Shot 27 November 1937, Chernihiv, with his three sons who also played bandura.
 Solomakh, Nykyfor
 Sotnychenko, Svyryd – Kuban bandurist shot 1920
 Symonenko, Vasyl' – kobzar
 Syniavsky, Oleksa – Philologist – Professor at the Kharkiv University.

T

 Tabinsky, Mykhailo – Lviv bandurist arrested 1949.
 Teliha, Mykhailo – Shot by Germans in 1942.
 Tertyshnyj, K.
 Teslia, Omelian – sentenced to be shot in 1938.
 Tokar, Illia
 Tokarevsky, Mykola – arrested 14/2/1931 Arrested 1938. released 1940.
 Tronevsky, O.
 Tsebrenko, Hryhoriy – Member of Kiev Bandurist Capella.
 Tsybuliv, Isak – Member of Kiev Bandurist Capella.

U

 Ul'chenko, Vasyl' – sentenced to be shot in 1938.

V

 Velykivskiy, A.
 Volodaretz, Petro. – sentenced to be shot in 1938.

Y

 Yatsenko, S.
 Yashchenko, Ovram Semenovych – member of Kiev Bandurist Capella 1918.
 Yermak, P.

Z

 Zaporozhetz, I.
 Zayetz, Mykola Martynovych – (b. 1902) Arrested 1923, Arrested 1937, Arrested 29/01/1938 sentence to be shot.
 Zatenko, – arrested 1938.
 Zelinsky, Ivan – arrested 1938.
 Zharko, Fedir – 6 years in labour camps.
 Zheplynsky, Bohdan – Lviv bandurist. Arrested 1950 – Siberia.
 Zheplynsky, Roman – Lviv bandurist. Arrested 1950 – Siberia.
 Zinchenko, A.
 Zinchenko, Illarion – sentenced to be shot in 1938.

References

Kobzarstvo
National revivals
Ukrainian independence movement
Anti-Ukrainian sentiment
Crimes of the communist regime in Ukraine against Ukrainians